The first generation (Generation I) of the Pokémon franchise features the original 151 fictional species of creatures introduced to the core video game series in the 1996 Game Boy games Pokémon Red and Blue.

The following list details the 151 Pokémon of Generation I in order of their National Pokédex number. The first Pokémon, Bulbasaur, is number 001 and the last, Mew, is number 151. Alternate forms that result in type changes are included for convenience. Mega evolutions and regional forms are included on the pages for the generation in which they were introduced. MissingNo., a glitch, is also on this list.

Design and development
The majority of Pokémon in Generation I had relatively simple designs and were highly analogous to real-life creatures including but not limited to: Pidgey (a pigeon), Krabby (a crab), Rattata (a rat), Ekans (a snake), Arbok (a cobra), Seel (a seal), and Dewgong (a dugong). Many Pokémon in the original games served as the base for repeating concepts later in the series.

List of Pokémon

 Bulbasaur
 Ivysaur
 Venusaur
 Charmander
 Charmeleon
 Charizard
 Squirtle
 Wartortle
 Blastoise
 Caterpie
 Metapod
 Butterfree
 Weedle
 Kakuna
 Beedrill
 Pidgey
 Pidgeotto
 Pidgeot
 Rattata
 Raticate
 Spearow
 Fearow
 Ekans
 Arbok
 Pikachu
 Raichu
 Sandshrew
 Sandslash
 Nidoran♀
 Nidorina
 Nidoqueen
 Nidoran♂
 Nidorino
 Nidoking
 Clefairy
 Clefable
 Vulpix
 Ninetales
 Jigglypuff
 Wigglytuff
 Zubat
 Golbat
 Oddish
 Gloom
 Vileplume
 Paras
 Parasect
 Venonat
 Venomoth
 Diglett
 Dugtrio
 Meowth
 Persian
 Psyduck
 Golduck
 Mankey
 Primeape
 Growlithe
 Arcanine
 Poliwag
 Poliwhirl
 Poliwrath
 Abra
 Kadabra
 Alakazam
 Machop
 Machoke
 Machamp
 Bellsprout
 Weepinbell
 Victreebel
 Tentacool
 Tentacruel
 Geodude
 Graveler
 Golem
 Ponyta
 Rapidash
 Slowpoke
 Slowbro
 Magnemite
 Magneton
 Farfetch'd
 Doduo
 Dodrio
 Seel
 Dewgong
 Grimer
 Muk
 Shellder
 Cloyster
 Gastly
 Haunter
 Gengar
 Onix
 Drowzee
 Hypno
 Krabby
 Kingler
 Voltorb
 Electrode
 Exeggcute
 Exeggutor
 Cubone
 Marowak
 Hitmonlee
 Hitmonchan
 Lickitung
 Koffing
 Weezing
 Rhyhorn
 Rhydon
 Chansey
 Tangela
 Kangaskhan
 Horsea
 Seadra
 Goldeen
 Seaking
 Staryu
 Starmie
 Mr. Mime
 Scyther
 Jynx
 Electabuzz
 Magmar
 Pinsir
 Tauros
 Magikarp
 Gyarados
 Lapras
 Ditto
 Eevee
 Vaporeon
 Jolteon
 Flareon
 Porygon
 Omanyte
 Omastar
 Kabuto
 Kabutops
 Aerodactyl
 Snorlax
 Articuno
 Zapdos
 Moltres
 Dratini
 Dragonair
 Dragonite
 Mewtwo
 Mew
 MissingNo.

Notes

References

Lists of Pokémon
Video game characters introduced in 1996